Dehesa de Cuéllar is a hamlet in Cuéllar municipality, Segovia Province, Castile and León, Spain. As of 2019, its population was of 33 people.

References 

Populated places in the Province of Segovia